Paul Wendel Noel (August 4, 1924 – November 16, 2005) was an American professional basketball player.

Born in Midway, Kentucky, Noel was a 6'4" forward from the University of Kentucky, Noel played five seasons (1947–1952) in the Basketball Association of America/National Basketball Association as a member of the New York Knicks and Rochester Royals.  He averaged 3.3 points per game in his BAA/NBA career and won a league championship with Rochester in 1951.

BAA/NBA career statistics

Regular season

Playoffs

References

External links

1924 births
2005 deaths
American men's basketball players
Basketball players from Kentucky
Kentucky Wildcats men's basketball players
New York Knicks players
People from Midway, Kentucky
Power forwards (basketball)
Rochester Royals players
Small forwards